Tuneup may refer to:

Tune Up! (album)
Tune-Up!
Service (motor vehicle)
AVG PC TuneUp